Anthology is a 1998 compilation album by Deborah Allen, distributed by Renaissance Records, Franklin, TN. Tracks 1 to 3 are overdubs with original Jim Reeves tracks to create duets. Steve Huey of AllMusic wrote that Jim Reeves' widow handpicked Allen to dub onto the three unfinished Reeves tracks.

Track listing

Track information and credits taken from the album's liner notes.

References

External links
Deborah Allen Official Site

1998 albums
Deborah Allen albums
Curb Records albums